Travis Wester is an American actor.  He was born on October 8, 1977, in the United States.

Career
An actor in American film and television, Wester's first role was in 1996's The Paper Brigade.  Portraying Jamie in 2004's EuroTrip, Rotten Tomatoes called this his best-known performance.  Wester has also performed in Boston Public, Scrubs, Felicity, ER, and Days of Our Lives.

Performance credits

References

External links
 

1977 births
20th-century American male actors
21st-century American male actors
Living people
American male film actors
American male television actors